The covector mapping principle is a special case of Riesz' representation theorem, which is a fundamental theorem in functional analysis.  The name was coined by Ross and co-workers, It provides conditions under which dualization can be commuted with discretization in the case of  computational optimal control.

Description
An application of Pontryagin's minimum principle to Problem , a given optimal control problem generates a boundary value problem.  According to Ross, this boundary value problem is a Pontryagin lift and is represented as Problem .  Now suppose one discretizes Problem .  This generates Problem where  represents the number of discrete points. For convergence, it is necessary to prove that as

In the 1960s Kalman and others showed that solving Problem  is extremely difficult.  This difficulty, known as the curse of complexity,  is complementary to the curse of dimensionality.

In a series of papers starting in the late 1990s, Ross and Fahroo showed that one could arrive at a solution to Problem  (and hence Problem ) more easily by discretizing first (Problem ) and dualizing afterwards (Problem ).  The sequence of operations must be done carefully to ensure consistency and convergence.  The covector mapping principle asserts that a covector mapping theorem can be discovered to map the solutions of Problem  to Problem  thus completing the circuit.

See also
Legendre pseudospectral method
Ross–Fahroo pseudospectral methods
Ross–Fahroo lemma

References

Optimal control